The Bemidji State Beavers represented Bemidji State University in 2012-13 WCHA women's ice hockey. The Beavers finished 8th in the conference and lost to undefeated Minnesota in the playoffs.

Offseason
June 13, 2012: Former Beavers captain Montana Vichorek was one of three student-athletes awarded a Post-Graduate Scholarship from the WCHA.
June 26, 2012: Former Bemidji State head coach Bruce Olson died at the age of 55 after succumbing to cancer.
July 31, 2012: Beavers captain Erika Wheelhouse is among 79 players invited to attend the USA Women’s Hockey Festival from August 5 to 13 in Blaine, Minnesota.

Recruiting

Transfers

2013–14 Beavers

Schedule

|-
!colspan=12 style=""| Regular Season

|-
!colspan=12 style=""| WCHA Tournament

Awards and honors

References

Bemidji State
Bemidji State Beavers women's ice hockey seasons
Bemidji